The 2013 Silverstone GP2 and GP3 Series rounds were a set of GP2 Series and GP3 Series motor races held at the Silverstone Circuit in Silverstone, United Kingdom on 29 and 30 June 2013 as the fifth round of the 2013 GP2 Series season and as the third round of the 2013 GP3 Series season.

Sam Bird took back-to-back Feature Race victories while Jon Lancaster of Hilmer Motorsport won his first race of the season in the Sprint race.

As for GP3, both Jack Harvey and Giovanni Venturini won the Feature and Sprint races respectively resulting in both drivers earning their first victories of the season.

GP2 Series classification

Qualifying

Feature race

Sprint race

References

Silverstone
Silverstone